The Reid Government refers to the period of federal executive government of Australia led by Prime Minister George Reid. It lasted from 18 August 1904 - 5 July 1905. Reid was the sole Prime Minister of Australia to belong to the Free Trade Party. Allan McLean of the Protectionist Party served as deputy.

Background

George Reid led the Free Trade Party and was Opposition Leader for 6 of the Australian Parliament's first 7 years of existence. The major issue of the first General Election of March 1901 was to be whether or not Australia would be established as a Protectionist or Free Trade nation. Prior to Federation, the Colony of Victoria had settled on Protectionism, while New South Wales had favoured Free Trade. In the absence of strong party affiliations outside the Australian Labour Party (which was divided on the question), candidates tended to be defined in relation to their attitude to trade, and while Barton sought compromise, the Free Trader George Reid pushed for the question to be a central election issue.

Following the March election, Barton's Protectionists won 27 seats in the newly formed 75 member Australian House of Representatives. Reid's Free Trade supporters won 32 seats, leaving the Labour Party, on 16 seats, with the balance of power. Labour confirmed "support in return for concessions" and backed Barton, who became Prime Minister in a minority government. The 36 seat Senate meanwhile held just 14 Senators declaring themselves in support of the Barton Government. The Deakin Government (1903-1904) and Watson Government followed the Barton Government.

The Watson Government governed from 27 April 1904 to 18 August 1904 and was the first Labor Party national government in both Australia and in the world. 
Chris Watson commanded a majority in neither the House of Representatives, nor the Senate. Amid the volatile environment of early Federation Australian politics, the Watson Government passed just six bills. Other than an amended Acts Interpretation Act 1904, these were all money bills, however, Watson advanced the landmark Conciliation and Arbitration Bill, passed later in 1904 by the Reid Government.

In Office

Reid's government continued the early work of establishing the legislative frameworks of the newly formed Australian Federation. George Reid led the Free Trade Party and was sworn in as Prime Minister on 18 August 1904, replacing the Watson Government. Reid governed in shaky coalition with the Protectionists, and his government lasted until July 1905. It was responsible for the passage of the Conciliation and Arbitration Act 1904.

Reid denounced the Labour Party as the "Socialist tiger". Watson encouraged Alfred Deakin to abandon the Free Traders, saying: "We, and especially me, don't want office, but I have the utmost anxiety to stop the retrogressive movement which Reid is heading." Deakin commenced his second term as Prime Minister in July 1905, with Labour's support

Reid adopted a strategy of trying to reorient the party system along Labour vs non-Labour lines – prior to the 1906 election, he renamed his Free Trade Party to the Anti-Socialist Party. Reid envisaged a spectrum running from socialist to anti-socialist, with the Protectionists in the middle. This attempt struck a chord with politicians who were steeped in the Westminster tradition and regarded a two-party system as very much the norm.

Aftermath

The Reid Government was succeeded by the Deakin Government (1905-1908).

See also

History of Australia
History of Australia (1901–45)

References

Reid